Charles VII (6 August 1697 – 20 January 1745) was Prince-Elector of Bavaria from 26 February 1726 and Holy Roman Emperor from 24 January 1742 to his death. He was also King of Bohemia (as Charles III) from 1741 to 1743. Charles was a member of the House of Wittelsbach, and his reign as Holy Roman Emperor thus marked the end of three centuries of uninterrupted Habsburg imperial rule, although he was related to the Habsburgs by both blood and marriage.

Charles was the eldest son of Maximilian II Emanuel, Elector of Bavaria, and the Polish princess Theresa Kunegunda Sobieska. He became elector following the death of his father in 1722. In 1726, Charles married Archduchess Maria Amalia of Austria, daughter of Holy Roman Emperor Joseph I and niece of Emperor Charles VI. The couple had seven children together. After Charles VI died in 1740, Elector Charles claimed the Archduchy of Austria and briefly gained hold of the Bohemian throne. In 1742, he was elected emperor of the Holy Roman Empire. He ruled until his death three years later.

Early life and career

Charles (Albert) was born in Brussels and the son of Maximilian II Emanuel, Elector of Bavaria, and Theresa Kunegunda Sobieska, daughter of King John III Sobieski of Poland.

His family was politically divided during the War of the Spanish Succession, and he spent many years under house arrest in Austria. The royal family had left Brussels and returned to Munich in 1701. His father, Maximilian Emanuel, fled to the Spanish Netherlands after he had been defeated at the Battle of Blenheim in August 1704, and Charles and his siblings stayed with their mother, the acting Regent, in Munich. In May 1705, after a stay in Venice, the Austrian authorities refused to allow the electress to return to Bavaria and forced her into exile, which lasted ten years. Maximilian Emanuel went also into exile to Compiègne after on April 29, 1706, an Imperial ban was imposed on him, as he again had been defeated at the Battle of Ramillies a few days earlier. Only in 1715 was the family reconciled. After attaining the majority age in August 1715, Charles undertook an educational tour to Italy from 3 December 1715 to 24 August 1716. In 1717, he served among Bavarian auxiliaries in the Austro-Turkish War.

On 5 October 1722, Charles married Archduchess Maria Amalia of Austria, whom he had met at the imperial court in Vienna. She was the youngest daughter of the late Emperor Joseph I and his wife, Wilhelmine Amalia of Brunswick-Lüneburg. Bavaria had renounced all claims to the throne via the marriage, but it provided the legal basis to the inheritance of certain Austrian possessions.

In 1725, Charles visited Versailles during the wedding celebrations of Louis XV of France and established a personal contact with the French court.

In 1726, after his father had died, Charles became Duke of Bavaria and thus one of the prince-electors of the Holy Roman Empire, and he also inherited a debt of 26 million guilders. He maintained good relations with both his Habsburg relatives and France, continuing his father's policies.

In 1729, he instituted the knightly Order of St George and ordered the beginning of the construction of the Rothenberg Fortress.

Holy Roman Emperor

In continuance of the policy of his father, Charles aspired to an even higher rank. As son-in-law of Joseph I, Holy Roman Emperor, Charles rejected the Pragmatic Sanction of 1713 and claimed the German territories of the Habsburg dynasty after the death of emperor Charles VI in 1740. By the Treaty of Nymphenburg, which was concluded in July 1741, Charles became allied with France and Spain against Austria.

During the War of the Austrian Succession, Charles invaded Upper Austria in 1741 and planned to conquer Vienna, but his allied French troops under the Duc de Belle-Isle were instead redirected to Bohemia, and Prague was conquered in November 1741. That meant that Charles was crowned King of Bohemia in Prague on 19 December 1741, when the Habsburgs had not yet been defeated. He was unanimously elected "King of the Romans" on 24 January 1742 and became Holy Roman Emperor upon his coronation on 12 February 1742. His brother Klemens August of Bavaria, the archbishop and elector (Kurfürst) of Cologne, generally sided with the Austria Habsburg-Lorraine faction in the disputes over the Habsburg succession but cast his vote for him and personally crowned him emperor at Frankfurt. George II of Great Britain, who was also Elector of Hanover, also voted to install Charles as Emperor even though both Britain and Hanover were allied with Austria in the ongoing war. Charles VII was the second Wittelsbach emperor after Louis IV and the first Wittelsbach king of Germany since the reign of Rupert.

Shortly after his coronation, most of Charles's territories were overrun by the Austrians, and Bavaria was occupied by the troops of Maria Theresa. The emperor fled Munich and resided for almost three years in the Palais Barckhaus in Frankfurt. Most of Bohemia was lost in December 1742, when the Austrians allowed the French under the Duc de Belle-Isle and the Duc de Broglie an honourable capitulation. Charles was mocked as an emperor who neither controlled his own realm nor was in effective control of the empire itself, but the institution of the Holy Roman Emperor had largely become symbolic in nature and powerless by then. A popular Latin saying about him was et Caesar et nihil, meaning "both Emperor and nothing", a word play on aut Caesar aut nihil, meaning "either Emperor or nothing". General Ignaz Felix, Count of Törring-Jettenbach was compared to a drum, as people "heard about him only when he was beaten".

Charles VII tried to emphasise his government in Frankfurt with numerous acts of law, such as the grant of imperial privilege to the University of Erlangen in 1743 and the creation of several new imperial nobles. Charles Eugene, Duke of Württemberg, was declared early to be of full age in 1744. Alexander Ferdinand, 3rd Prince of Thurn and Taxis served as Principal Commissioner for Charles VII at the Perpetual Imperial Diet in Frankfurt am Main and in 1744 the Thurn und Taxis dynasty were appointed the hereditary Postmasters General of the Imperial Reichspost.

The new commander of the Bavarian army, Friedrich Heinrich von Seckendorff, fought Austria in a series of battles in 1743 and 1744. In 1743, his troops and their allies took Bavaria, and Charles was able to return to Munich in April for some time. After the allied French had to retreat after defeats to the Rhine, he lost Bavaria again. The new campaign of Frederick II of Prussia during the Second Silesian War finally forced the Austrian army to leave Bavaria and to retreat into Bohemia. In October 1744, Charles regained Munich and returned. Under the mediation of former Vice-Chancellor Friedrich Karl von Schönborn, the emperor then sought a balance with Vienna but also negotiated unsuccessfully with France for new military support.

Suffering severely from gout, Charles died at Nymphenburg Palace in January 1745. His brother Klemens August then again leaned towards Austria, and his son and successor Maximilian III Joseph made peace with Austria. With the Treaty of Füssen, Austria recognized the legitimacy of Charles's election as Holy Roman Emperor.

He is buried in the crypt of the Theatinerkirche in Munich. His heart was separately buried in the Shrine of Our Lady of Altötting. Georg Philipp Telemann composed his requiem "I was Hoping for Light". King Frederick the Great of Prussia wrote in 1746, "This death robbed me of the emperor, who was my friend".

Cultural legacy

Charles VII's reign represented the height of the Bavarian Rococo era. The Nymphenburg Palace was completed during his reign. The Grand Circle (Schlossrondell), which is flanked by a string of elaborate Baroque mansions was initially planned as a basic blueprint for a new city (Carlstadt), but that was not achieved. Charles VII resided in Nymphenburg, and the palace became the favorite summer residence of the future lords of Bavaria. Charles effected the building of the Ancestral Gallery and the Ornate Rooms at the Munich Residenz. He purchased the Palais Porcia in 1731 and had the mansion restored in Rococo style in 1736 for one of his mistresses, Countess Topor-Morawitzka. The mansion was named after her husband, Prince Porcia. He also ordered François de Cuvilliés, chief architect of the court, to build the Palais Holnstein for another one of his mistresses, Sophie Caroline von Ingenheim, Countess Holnstein, between 1733 and 1737. Cuvilliés constructed the Amalienburg as well for Charles and his wife, Maria Amalia, an elaborate hunting lodge designed in the Rococo style between 1734 and 1739 in the Nymphenburg Palace Park.

Before and during Charles's reign, numerous accomplished, Italian, French and Bavarian and other German architects, sculptors, painters and artisans were employed in royal service, often for many years. Among them were Agostino Barelli, Dominique Girard, François de Cuvilliés, Leo von Klenze, Roman Anton Boos, Friedrich Ludwig Sckell, Joseph Effner, Konrad Eberhard, Joseph Baader, Ignaz Günther, Johann Michael Fischer, Cosmas Damian Asam and Egid Quirin Asam, Johann Michael Feuchtmayer, Matthäus Günther, Johann Baptist Straub and Johann Baptist Zimmermann.

Children
Charles and his wife, Archduchess Maria Amalia of Austria, were parents of seven children:

Illegitimate children
Charles Albert and his mistress Sophie Caroline von Ingelheim had a son:
 Franz Ludwig, Count of Holnstein (1723–1780) ∞ Anna Marie zu Löwenfeld (1735–1783), daughter of Clemens August of Bavaria. He had issue:
 Maximilian Joseph, Count of Holnstein, married to Princess Maria Josepha of Hohenlohe-Waldenburg-Schillingsfürst (1774–1824), daughter of Prince Charles Albert II.

Titles
Charles VII, by the grace of God elected Holy Roman Emperor, forever August, King in Germany and of Bohemia, Duke in the Upper and Lower Bavaria as well as the Upper Palatinate, Count-Palatine of the Rhine, Archduke of Austria, Prince-Elector of the Holy Roman Empire, Landgrave of Leuchtenberg, etc. etc.

Ancestry

See also
 War of the Austrian Succession
 War of the Bavarian Succession

References

External links 

 
1697 births
1745 deaths
18th-century Holy Roman Emperors
18th-century prince-electors of Bavaria
House of Wittelsbach
Pretenders to the Bohemian throne
Knights of the Golden Fleece of Spain
German military personnel of the War of the Austrian Succession
Nobility from Brussels
Burials at the Theatine Church, Munich
Imperial vicars